Lalabad-e Kol Kol may refer to:
 Lalabad-e Kol Kol 1
 Lalabad-e Kol Kol 2